

Description
Route 102 is a highway that follows the west bank of the Saint John River for 157 kilometres from Pokiok to Westfield. Most of the route is colloquially (but not officially) known as the Old River Road, as it was the original road connecting Fredericton and Saint John.  

The highway progresses along the Saint John River in Pokiok passing the Hawkshaw Bridge to Route 105 turning northeast as it passes through Hawkshaw, Barony, and Dumfries.  The route then passes through Prince William crossing Joslin Creek Basin then entering Lower Prince William as it passes Kings Landing and an interchange with Route 635.  The route continues past Longs Creek Passing the northern terminus Of The New Brunswick Route 3 Continuing Following the river past Woolastook Park and the Mactaquac Dam through Upper Kingsclear, Central Kingsclear, and Lower Kingsclear, as well as French Village and Island View as it enters Fredericton. 

The route enters Fredericton in the neighbourhood of Silverwood continuing onto the Woodstock Road, then follows Brunswick Street or a riverfront parkway known as St. Anne's Point Drive (depending on direction) through the downtown area, leaving on Waterloo Row. Route 102 continues to follow the river along Lincoln Road, passing the Fredericton International Airport and reaching the town of Oromocto. 

Route 102 continues along the river passing the Burton Bridge through Burton, Upper Gagetown, Coytown, Mill Road,  Gagetown, Upper Hampstead, and Pleasant Villa.  Continuing past the Otnabog Lake, the route continues through Queenstown, Central Hampstead, and Hampstead.   Evandale is the next destination, continuing through Upper Greenwich, Oak Point and Central Greenwich as well as Glenwood, Browns Flat, and Greenwich Hill.

Continuing along, the route continues into Lower Greenwich, Public Landing, Morrisdale, and Woodmans Point then crosses the Nerepis River to reach Grand Bay-Westfield on the west side. The route continues crossing Route 177 then finally ending at Route 7 at exit 80.

History
The section from Pokiok to Fredericton, a former alignment of the Trans-Canada Highway (Route 2), became part of Route 102 in stages between 2000 and 2006, as sections of the new 4-lane Trans-Canada Highway were opened. This section begins at the interchange of Route 2 and Route 102 in Pokiok, following a newly built access road for a short distance to an interchange with the Pokiok Road (formerly part of Route 2). 
An extension of the route was built in the 1980s to meet with Route 7. The Gagetown, Hampstead and Evandale ferries, small, toll-free, cable ferries connect Route 102 to the other side of the river.

As the River Road, the present-day Route 102 (then a part of Route 2) was the first road connecting Fredericton and Saint John to be paved, ahead of the Broad Road (the present-day Route 7). With the alignment of the Trans-Canada Highway bypassing Saint John, and the upgrades of the Broad Road in the 1950s taking most traffic off the River Road, its importance as a major traffic route diminished. The River Road became Route 102 in 1965.

See also
List of New Brunswick provincial highways

References

New Brunswick provincial highways
Saint John River (Bay of Fundy)
Roads in York County, New Brunswick
Roads in Sunbury County, New Brunswick
Roads in Queens County, New Brunswick
Roads in Kings County, New Brunswick
Transport in Fredericton
N